The 2015 Football Federation Victoria season was the second season under the new competition format for state-level football (soccer) in Victoria.  The competition consisted of seven divisions across the state of Victoria.

League Tables

2015 National Premier Leagues Victoria

The 2015 National Premier Leagues Victoria season was played over 26 rounds.  The overall premier of this division qualified for the 2015 National Premier Leagues finals series, competing with the other state federation champions in a final knockout tournament to decide the National Premier Leagues champion for 2015.

Finals

Promotion/relegation play-off

Top Scorers

2015 National Premier Leagues Victoria 1

West

The 2015 National Premier Leagues Victoria 1 West was played over 28 rounds, with each team playing the teams in their conference twice and the other conference once.  The top team at the end of the season was promoted to National Premier Leagues Victoria, Bentleigh Greens second placed team entered the promotion play-off.

East

The 2015 National Premier Leagues Victoria 1 East was played over 28 rounds, with each team playing the teams in their conference twice and the other conference once.  The top team at the end of the season was promoted to National Premier Leagues Victoria, whilst the second placed team entered the promotion play-off.

Grand Final

The NPL1 Season concluded with a single match between the winners of the leagues in the West and East sections, to determine the NPL1 Victoria Champion.

2015 Victoria State League 1

North-West

South-East

2015 Victoria State League 2

North-West

South-East

2015 Victoria State League 3

North-West

South-East

Promotion/relegation play-off

2015 Victoria State League 4

North

West

South

East

2015 Victoria State League 5

North

West

South

East

2015 Women's Premier League

This was the final season of the WPL format, known for sponsorship reasons as the Sportsmart Women's Premier League. This competition was replaced by the National Premier Leagues Victoria Women.

Finals

Cup Competitions

2015 Dockerty Cup

Football Victoria soccer clubs competed in 2015 for the Dockerty Cup. The tournament doubled as the Victorian qualifiers for the 2015 FFA Cup, with the top four clubs progressing to the Round of 32. A total of 191 clubs entered the qualifying phase, with the clubs entering in a staggered format.

The Cup was won by South Melbourne.

In addition to the two A-League clubs (Melbourne Victory and Melbourne City), the four semi-finalists (Heidelberg United, Hume City, Oakleigh Cannons and South Melbourne) competed in the final rounds of the 2015 FFA Cup.

References

Football Federation Victoria
Soccer in Victoria (Australia)